"Standing with You" is a song by Australian singer Guy Sebastian, released on 26 June 2020 as the fourth single from his ninth studio album T.R.U.T.H.. The song debuted at number 23 on the ARIA charts, becoming Sebastian's 24th ARIA top 50 single.

At the 2020 ARIA Music Awards it won ARIA Award for Best Video.

The song was nominated for Song of the Year at the APRA Music Awards of 2021

Background
Sebastian co-wrote the song with Jamie Hartman, who also produced and co-wrote "Before I Go", the Platinum-selling, lead single from Sebastian's forthcoming album. Sebastian said "We've written quite a few tunes together, Jamie and myself, so it's proving to be a good partnership".

The song centres around issues surrounding mental-ill health and the struggle to support loved ones who are suffering. In a lead-up to the song's release, Sebastian said "A family member of mine was going through a very tough time, and he was brave enough to share his battle with his own mental health, and that inspired this song".

Sebastian and Hartman tapped into their own experiences with the vastly increasing number of people who are struggling with depression and mental health issues. Sebastian said "It's about the power of just being there. Sometimes – as a friend or as a support to people who go through things – it's not about having the right anecdotes or answers; it's really more about just being that silent presence. Especially at a time like this when there's a lot of people who are feeling isolated, this song is a reminder to look out for people who feel alone".

Music video
The music video for "Standing with You" was directed by James Chappell and released on 26 June 2020.

Charts

Weekly charts

Year-end charts

Certifications

References

2020 singles
Guy Sebastian songs
Sony Music Australia singles
2020 songs
Songs written by Guy Sebastian
Songs written by Jamie Hartman
Songs written by Greg Holden
ARIA Award-winning songs